Lawrence A. Bock (September 21, 1959July 6, 2016) was an American entrepreneur who has aided in starting or financing 50 early-stage growth companies, with a combined market value of more than $70 billion.

Personal life 

Bock was born in Brooklyn, New York, and raised in Chappaqua to parents Ulrike Proctor and Richard Bock. Larry had one older sibling Steven who was deaf. He received a degree in biochemistry from Bowdoin College and an MBA from UCLA. After school, he worked for Genentech. Bock was a donor, co-founder, and the executive director of USA Science and Engineering Festival.  

Bock was married to Diane Birnie Bock for thirty years and had two daughters, Quincy Bock Stokes and Tasha Bock (Scruggs).

Blindness 

Bock suffered from Stargardt disease, an inherited form of macular degeneration that causes progressive loss of vision. He was legally blind by the age of 29.

Career 
Bock was highlighted as a "keystone species" in the ecosystem of Silicon Valley in the book The Rainforest. A keystone species, in the innovation context, is someone who connects people who would benefit from working together, but who would not work together under normal circumstances because of trust, distance, and/or cultural barriers. 

Bock was previously a CEO of Nanosys, where he helped to raise $55 million in funding. Bock was also a special limited partner with Lux Capital.

Bock founded multiple companies: 
 Illumina, a biotechnology company for genetic products
 Nanosys, a nanotechnology company for optics and batteries
 Pharmacopeia biotechnology, a company investigating small molecule combinatorial chemistry
 Idun Pharmaceuticals, a company developing drugs targeting apoptosis
 Caliper Life Sciences, which aids in drug discovery.
 Neurocrine Biosciences, which develops treatments for neurological and endocrine-related diseases and disorders.
 Science Spark, a nonprofit group advocating for science, technology, engineering, and math (STEM) education

USA Science and Engineering Festival

Bock worked with Lockheed Martin to start the first USA Science and Engineering Festival in San Diego. It was later moved to Washington D.C. It premiered on the National Mall but was later moved to the Walter E. Washington Convention Center where it attracted more than 350,000 participants in 2016, making it the largest event housed in the convention center.

Death 

Bock died from pancreatic cancer on July 6, 2016.

References

1959 births
2016 deaths
American investors
Bowdoin College alumni
Businesspeople from Brooklyn
People from Chappaqua, New York
UCLA Anderson School of Management alumni
Deaths from cancer in New York (state)
American chief executives